Fall Rock is an unincorporated community in Clay County, Kentucky, United States.
They are located on the Morgan Branch tributary of Laurel Creek, just under 1 mile upstream from the branch mouth, on United States Highway 421, the school across the road from the post office.

Fall Rock post office was established on 1924-05-22 by postmaster John Campbell, and named after the original name of Morgan Branch which was Falls Branch or Fall Rock Branch.

However, the village and school were originally named Pinhook, local oral histories stating that this was after a local fisherman who made fishing hooks out of safety pins bought in the local store.
Named John Campbell (not the aforementioned postmaster) he gained the name "Pinhook" Campbell.
The village and school were renamed after the post office when schooling was consolidated in the county in the 20th century.

Cross-reference

Sources

 

Unincorporated communities in Clay County, Kentucky
Unincorporated communities in Kentucky